The 1998 World Weightlifting Championships were held in Lahti, Finland from 7 to 15 November 1998. The men's competition in the light-heavyweight (85 kg) division was staged on 13 November 1998.

Medalists

Records

Results

New records

References
Results
Weightlifting World Championships Seniors Statistics, Pages 16–17 

1998 World Weightlifting Championships